Wila Qullu (Aymara wila blood, blood-red, qullu mountain, "red mountain", also spelled Huilacollo) is a mountain south of the Barroso mountain range in the Andes of Peru which reaches a height of approximately . It is located in the Tacna Region, Tacna Province, Palca District. Wila Qullu lies west of Chupikiña.

References 

Mountains of Tacna Region
Mountains of Peru